Kohlhiesels Töchter (English:Kohlhiesel's Daughters) may refer to:
 
 Kohlhiesels Töchter (1920 film)
 Kohlhiesels Töchter (1962 film)